I Thank You is a 1941 black and white British comedy film directed by Marcel Varnel and starring Arthur Askey, Richard Murdoch, Graham Moffatt and Moore Marriott. It was produced by Edward Black at Gainsborough Pictures.

Plot summary 
The film is set in London during the Second World War at the time of the Blitz. The leads are a couple of out of work variety entertainers who use great ingenuity in their efforts to get financial assistance to "put on a show". Hoping to put their proposal to the formidable Lady Randall, ex-music hall star Lily Morris, they infiltrate her house in the guise of a servant (Murdoch) and cook (Askey - in drag). After some farcical interludes, they achieve their aim after Lady Randall is persuaded to sing an old music hall standard "Waiting at the Church" at an impromptu show located underground at Aldwych tube station, - used during wartime as an underground bomb shelter. As the ex-music hall star, Lily Morris plays herself. The title of the film is a gentrified version of Arthur Askey's famous catch-phrase - "I thangyew". Also in the film is elderly comic actor Moore Marriott, who plays Lady Randall's eccentric father, and Graham Moffatt as Albert who also appears under that name in the comedy films of both Will Hay and Arthur Askey.

Cast 
Arthur Askey as Arthur
Richard Murdoch as Stinker
Lily Morris as Lady Randall
Moore Marriott as Pop Bennett
Graham Moffatt as Albert Brown
Peter Gawthorne as Dr. Pope
Kathleen Harrison as Cook
Felix Aylmer as Henry Potter
 Eleanor Farrell as herself
 Charlie Forsythe as himself 
 Addie Seamon as herself
Issy Bonn as himself
Cameron Hall as Lomas
Wally Patch as Bill
Roberta Huby as Bobbie
Noel Dainton as Police Sergeant
Phyllis Morris as Miss Pizer

Soundtrack 
Arthur Askey - "Hello to the Sun" (Written by Noel Gay and Frank Eyton)
Arthur Askey and Richard Murdoch - "Half of Everything Is Yours" (Written by Noel Gay and Frank Eyton)
Eleanor Farrell - "Oh Johnny, Teach Me to Dance" (Written by Noel Gay and Frank Eyton)
Charlie Forsythe - "Let's Get Hold of Hitler" (Written by Noel Gay and Frank Eyton)
Lily Morris - "Waiting at the Church" (Written by Fred W. Leigh and Henry E. Pether)

Critical reception
The Radio Times gave the film two out of five stars, and wrote, "not even the hard-working Arthur Askey and Richard Murdoch plus Will Hay old boys Moore Marriott and Graham Moffatt can warm up this tepid "upstairs-downstairs" charade"; whereas Sky Movies rated the film three out of five stars, describing it as a "cheerful, long-unseen British wartime romp...It's all directed by that master of comic organisation, Frenchman Marcel (Oh, Mr Porter!) Varnel. It's not one of his best, and some of it looks pretty dated now, but some scenes still raise a hearty chuckle."

References

External links 

1941 films
British comedy films
British World War II propaganda films
1940s English-language films
British black-and-white films
1941 comedy films
Films directed by Marcel Varnel
Battle of Britain films
Gainsborough Pictures films
Films with screenplays by Marriott Edgar